Knickerbocker Building may refer to:

Knickerbocker Building (New Rochelle, New York)
The Knickerbocker Hotel (Manhattan), Broadway & 42nd Street, New York City, also known as The Knickerbocker Building
Knickerbocker Trust Company building, Fifth Avenue & 34th Street, New York City
Knickerbocker Building, Baltimore, Maryland; see Mitchell A. Dubow